Friedrich Egon von Fürstenberg (8 October 1813 – 20 August 1892) was a prelate of the Catholic Church who was archbishop of Olomouc from 1853 until his death almost forty years later. He was made a cardinal in 1879. By birth, he was member of the collateral branch of the House of Fürstenberg.

Biography
Friedrich Egon von Fürstenberg was born in Vienna in the Austrian Empire on 8 October 1813. He had the title of Landgrave; his parents were Landgrave Friedrich Carl zu Fürstenberg-Weitra (1774-1856) and Princess Maria Theresie zu Schwarzenberg (1780-1870). He was the cousin of Cardinal Friedrich Prince zu Schwarzenberg (1809–1885).

He chose to pursue a clerical career over his family's opposition. He studied theology at the University of Vienna from 1831 to 1835 and then earned a doctorate in theology at the University of Olomouc in 1838. He became a non-resident canon of the cathedral chapter of Olomouc in 1832 and was ordained a priest on 15 October 1836. 

He was chosen archbishop of Olomouc by its chapter on 6 June 1853 and the pope confirmed his appointment on 27 June 1853. He received his episcopal consecration in Olomouc on 4 September 1853 from his cousin Cardinal von Schwarzenberg, the archbishop of Prague.

Pope Leo XIII made him a cardinal priest on 12 May 1879. He received his red galero and the title of San Crisogono on 27 February 1880.

He died in Hukvaldy, Moravia, on 20 August 1892.

Notes

References

External links

1813 births
1892 deaths
Clergy from Vienna
Archbishops of Olomouc
Cardinals created by Pope Leo XIII